"Dance My Generation" is a single by Japanese band Golden Bomber. It was released on January 1, 2013. It debuted in number one on the weekly Oricon Singles Chart and reached number one on the Billboard Japan Hot 100. It was the 34th best-selling single in Japan in 2013, with 177,565 copies. The song is featured in the 2014 Japanese dance video game Just Dance Wii U.

References 

2013 singles
2013 songs
Japanese-language songs
Golden Bomber songs
Oricon Weekly number-one singles
Billboard Japan Hot 100 number-one singles